The International Road Cycling Challenge was a one-off, one-day bicycle race that served as one of six Brazilian events in the year-long 2015 UCI America Tour and acted as a test event for the 2016 Summer Olympics. The race was rated a grade of 1.2 and was part of the "Aquece Rio" series of events. The race was run over most of the Olympic course. Most of the riders represented countries instead of trade teams; however, there were several, mainly Brazilian, trade teams in the race. The race was won by French cyclist Alexis Vuillermoz.

Route

Teams and riders

Of 73 starters, only 29 riders finished.

Result

References

External links

Cycle races in Brazil
UCI America Tour races
2015 in men's road cycling
2015 in Brazilian sport
Cycling